Eva Lys (born 12 January 2002) is a German professional tennis player. Lys reached a career-high WTA ranking of world No. 116 in singles on 13 February 2023. She has won three singles titles on the ITF Women's Circuit.

Personal Life
She was born in Kyiv, Ukraine. Her father Volodymyr is a former tennis player who represented Ukraine in the Davis Cup, and currently is a coach in Hamburg. Lys' older sister Lisa Matviyenko is also a tennis player. She went to school at the Sportgymnasium Alter Teichweg in Hamburg, from where Marvin Möller and Carina Witthöft also graduated. She still has family in Ukraine, and after the 2022 Russian invasion of Ukraine she complained of some Russian players' "disrespectful" behaviour.

Career

As a junior she participated in the 2020 Australian Open, winning in the qualifiers but losing in the first round.

Lys made her WTA Tour main draw debut at the 2021 Hamburg European Open when she received a wildcard into the doubles draw, partnering Noma Noha Akugue. They lost to Mona Barthel and Mandy Minella in the first round. Lys made her singles debut at the 2022 Porsche Tennis Grand Prix in Stuttgart, coming through the qualifying and beating Viktorija Golubic in the first round, before she lost to world No. 1, Iga Świątek, in the second.

She made her Grand Slam main-draw debut at the 2023 Australian Open.

Singles performance timeline

Only WTA Tour and Grand Slam tournament main-draw results are considered in the career statistics.

Current through the 2023 Indian Wells Open qualifying.

ITF Circuit finals

Singles: 4 (3 titles, 1 runner-up)

Head-to-head record

Record against top 10 players
Lys' record against players who have been ranked in the top 10, with those who are active in boldface.''

References

External links
 
 
 

2002 births
Living people
Sportspeople from Kyiv
German female tennis players
German people of Ukrainian descent
21st-century German women